Clementine is a fictional character in The Walking Dead episodic adventure video game series and Clementine, a spin-off of the Robert Kirkman comic of the same name and developed by Telltale Games. An original character developed by Telltale for the video game series, she is the series' main protagonist and one of the playable characters. She is voiced by Melissa Hutchison and was written by several people, including Gary Whitta.

Clementine is introduced in the first season as a young girl, left in the care of her babysitter Sandra while her parents are out of town, at the start of the zombie apocalypse. She is found and cared for by Lee Everett, another survivor, who tries to help her find her parents, and becomes a father-figure to her, teaching her how to survive. Lee is eventually bitten, and after a tearful goodbye, Clementine travels with other groups. Over several years, she becomes a guardian to Alvin Jr. (AJ for short), a child whose parents died in the apocalypse, and comes to raise him as Lee did with her.

Clementine was considered an emotional centerpiece of The Walking Dead game, and several journalists expressed caring for her fate in a way that few other games have been able to capture. Following Telltale's sudden closure in the midst of releasing The Walking Dead: The Final Season, Kirkman acquired the game's assets and brought some of the Telltale staff on to finish the season within his company Skybound Entertainment, as he felt it was necessary to give closure to Clementine's story. The character subsequently appeared in the 2021 series Skybound X and appear later in the comic book of the same name by Tillie Walden in 2022.

Concept and creation
Clementine first appeared in the 2012 episodic video game The Walking Dead. According to the game's creative lead Sean Vanaman, Clementine was "literally the first idea" for developing the game, with her emotional climax at the finale of the fifth episode being established before any of the game's other dialogue was written. The development team had considered the inclusion of a child in a dark storyline to be similar to previous story elements from Robert Kirkman's The Walking Dead comic, but still had a difficult time of selling the concept originally. They then set to use Clementine as the "moral compass" for the main player character, establishing her as a "smart, honest, and capable girl" that would reflect on choices made by the player. Telltale had considered other backgrounds for Clementine, such as being from a single-parent family, or being the younger sister of the player character, but found that the pre-established emotional bond between the characters did not fit well, and instead opted to make Lee Everett her father-figure. This led to changing Clementine's race  to African-American to give her the appearance of possibly being Lee's daughter to other characters.

Clementine's design was based on art director Derek Sakai's own daughter. Sakai described her as having "a crazy sense of fashion", selecting beloved clothing items to wear regularly. As such, Clementine was given an iconic baseball hat that serves as her connection to her parents. Sakai provided Vanaman with other advice from his fatherhood, offering that Clementine would appear smarter if she did not say as much, while still pointing out character flaws should one get out of line. Much of the game focuses on changes to Clementine's appearances and personality as she comes to grips with the new reality of the zombie-infested world. At the start of the game, Clementine is wearing a clean white dress, but it becomes dirty and soiled throughout the game, "reflecting her loss of innocence", according to Sakai.

Melissa Hutchison, a voice actress that had previously worked on other Telltale games, was selected to be the voice for Clementine. Prior auditions were held, but Vanaman found that children could not grasp the emotion of the role while adults were not able to get the voice as they intended for the character; at one point, for lack of a suitable actress, Vanaman felt that "we were going to have to take Clementine out of the game". Hutchison was able to relate to the character of Clementine, as her life mirrored that of the character, and easily fell into the role of the character during auditions, securing her as the voice for Clementine.

The bond between Clementine and Lee was considered instrumental to the game by Telltale. Gary Whitta described Lee's and Clementine's relationship as "emotionally authentic". To build this relation, Clementine was introduced as early as possible within the first episode; the specific scene of Lee having to deal with Clementine's zombified babysitter was specifically to highlight Clementine's likability, resourcefulness, and vulnerability. The writers carefully had to balance elements in this scene, as if, for example, Clementine appeared to be annoying to the player, the emotional bond would be absent and the player would likely make choices without caring about Clementine's fate. Writer Jake Rodkin stated that the difficulties of writing a child character that the player wouldn't want to abandon led to serious discussion about dropping Clementine late in the development process, a week before voice recording was to start. The game designer and writer Harrison G. Pink commented that the in-game decisions were not meant to be good because there couldn't be an optimal play-through. Clementine made those decisions even more difficult, since her presence forces the player to consider protecting her on another level. "It gets way more blurred when you involve Clementine," Pink said. "You have these decisions that are probably the right decisions for the group--she's watching, but then maybe she needs to understand this, but I might scare her because she'll think I'm a crazy person. There's no wrong choice, if you can justify it and it feels properly motivated to you, it's a valid choice."

With the game's second season, Clementine becomes the playable character, a choice that allowed them to continue the themes of the first season while introducing new characters and situations for the second. Telltale was first challenged to try to make Clementine feel like the character that the player, through making decisions as Lee, had groomed. One method this was resolved by was to create the first scenario of the game to put the player in control of Clementine's actions that have disastrous results (the death of one character and being separated from another) as to make the player felt as if they had made those choices and separating them from familiar characters. Further, they had to consider how to present Clementine as a character that could make substantial changes on the world and characters around her despite being a child.

Telltale had intended for The Walking Dead: The Final Season to be their final game featuring Clementine. As they were in the midst of developing and releasing this season, the studio suffered from a major financial crisis, forcing them to lay off nearly all of their staff and shutter existing projects. On this news, Robert Kirkman and others at Skybound Entertainment considered how they could finish the game, as Kirkman felt it was necessary to complete Clementine's story. Skybound brought in a portion of the former Telltale staff that had been working on The Final Season to complete the remaining episodes. In the one-shot spin-off "Negan Lives" comic published in July 2020, Kirkman ended the comic with a letter to the series fans, closing it with "P.S. Clementine Lives", which was taken as a hint that Kirkman may be involved with a means of re-introducing Clementine to The Walking Dead world. Kirkman again alluded to a possible future work involving Clementine at the 2020 virtual New York Comic Con. An issue of Image Comics' Skybound X, featuring stories from various Skybound properties, including one story around Clementine in The Walking Dead universe, was published in July 2021.

A three-book series, titled Clementine, released by Skybound starting in June 22, 2022. The series is being drawn and written by Tillie Walden. Clementine makes a cameo appearance in the 2021 remaster of Sam & Max: Beyond Time and Space, with Hutchinson reprising her voice role.

Appearances

The Walking Dead: Season One
Clementine is introduced when Lee Everett takes shelter in her suburban home in Georgia to find refuge from zombies (referred to in-universe as walkers). She is revealed to be hiding from the walkers alone in a tree house as her parents had left for Savannah some time before the apocalypse. Lee offers to take and protect Clementine, hoping that they will be able to find her parents.

They eventually join a small group of survivors, which include Kenny, his wife Katjaa and his son Kenny "Duck" Jr. Following several weeks struggling to survive, the survivors decide to head to Savannah, believing that if they can find a boat, they can find safety away from the mainland. As a choice to the player, Kenny and Lee are forced to euthanize Duck or leave him to re-animate after he is bitten by a walker, causing Katjaa to kill herself. Lee starts to help Clementine learn survival skills such as how to use a gun and why she needs to keep her hair short. As they near Savannah, Clementine's walkie-talkie goes off, and an unknown man tells her to come to meet him at the hotel downtown, the same hotel her parents would have been at.

The survivors meet other people still alive in Savannah and eventually they find a boat. The group prepares to leave but Clementine and the boat go missing, and Lee in his haste to find her is bitten by a walker. Lee convinces the remaining survivors, including Kenny and friends Omid and Christa, to help locate Clementine. Kenny is lost during a walker attack, while Lee ends up separated from Omid and Christa. Lee goes to the hotel to find Clementine held hostage by an insane man who blames Lee for his family's death. They work together to kill the man and escape. Lee covers Clementine and himself in walker guts to mask their scent and as they walk through a horde they find Clementine's parents, both turned. Lee passes out and Clementine drags him into a nearby shelter. Knowing he is about to turn, Lee gives Clementine some last pieces of advice and tells her to meet Omid and Christa. He then asks her to kill him or leave him (a choice left to the player). Later, Clementine has safely left the city. She then goes back to Omid and Christa, They then leave the city and Journey across Georgia.

The Walking Dead: Season Two
Season Two starts some months after the end of the first season. Clementine has regrouped with Omid and Christa, but her carelessness at a rest stop causes Omid to be killed by a scavenger. Sixteen months later, she and Christa are separated by another scavenger attack, and Clementine joins another group of survivors living in a cabin. She learns that this group is being tracked by a man named William Carver, who believes that one member of the group, Rebecca, is carrying his child.

The cabin survivors move north, hoping to reach the rumored safe place called Wellington. They find a ski lodge inhabited by another group, where Clementine finds Kenny alive. During a walker attack, the combined groups are saved by the sudden appearance of Carver and his minions, who take the survivors as their prisoners to a well-fortified department store. Seeing Carver's ruthlessness leads three other survivors, Jane, Mike, and Bonnie, to join Clementine and the others in plotting an escape before the store is overrun by a mass of walkers. Clementine aids in their escape, and Kenny kills Carver.

As they flee, Kenny's girlfriend Sarita is bit by a walker and dies. When they regroup, Kenny is distraught and refuses to talk to anyone, but he is convinced to help Rebecca give birth to her baby, which is later named Alvin Jr. or AJ. Jane takes interest in Clementine, and like Lee before, helps to teach her some survival skills. The group continues northward despite Rebecca's worsening health. They are ambushed by a group of Russian immigrants, leading to a Mexican standoff. Clementine sees that Rebecca has succumbed to exhaustion and blood loss from the birth, has died but is now re-animating as a walker, and she or Kenny are forced to shoot her to save AJ. This sets off the gunfight, but the group manages to kill the other Russians, and they force the sole Russian survivor, named Arvo, to take them to shelter. As they cross a frozen lake, their added weight causes the ice to break and one of their members, Luke, to fall through and drown.

Later that evening, Clementine discovers Arvo and others attempting to sneak away, due to being afraid of Kenny's rage, which leads to Arvo shooting Clementine, causing her to faint. When she wakes she finds herself with Kenny, Jane, and AJ heading north in a truck. They are forced to stop as a snowstorm approaches with the road blocked ahead, and Kenny goes to look for a way around; while he is gone, a walker horde appears, and Clementine is separated from Jane and AJ but finds shelter in a nearby rest stop where she finds Kenny. Jane appears and implies that AJ has been killed, causing Kenny to attack her. The two struggle and Clementine are forced to have one or both of them die. After the fight, she finds AJ safely hidden in a nearby car as part of Jane's plan to expose Kenny's temperament and convince Clementine to abandon him with her. The player can either decide for Clementine to leave with AJ alone or be accompanied by the survivor of the fight. If Kenny is chosen, the player may either choose to have Clementine enter Wellington with AJ alone or to continue traveling with Kenny. If Jane is chosen, the pair return to the department store. there, a family of three will ask to come in, you can either let them in or don't let them in. If Jane is killed and Clementine shoots Kenny or if Clementine shot Kenny and abandons Jane, she will go alone.

The Walking Dead: A New Frontier
Season 3 ( A New Frontier ) Takes place some years after Season 2. The story mainly follows Javier García. Clementine is also a playable character. The game takes place a few years after the second season, where several events have occurred to her depending on which ending the player chooses in it. She will have a scar on her forehead, a scar on her left cheek, an "AJ" brand on her left hand or a missing left ringfinger depending on which of the events occur. She currently tends to AJ, now a toddler.

Clementine's history since the end of Season Two is told in flashbacks throughout A New Frontier. If she and AJ had gone with Kenny, she would spend the next two years together with Kenny, who would take care of both of them and became a father-figure for the two, and in one day after two years, Clementine accidentally crashes a car while being taught how to drive by Kenny who is subsequently paralyzed from the waist down. He sacrifices himself to walkers as Clementine and AJ flee from the crash site. If Clementine had gone with Jane, she lives with her at the department store for a short time until Jane commits suicide after finding out she is pregnant. If Clementine stayed at Wellington, she and AJ will be cared for by their guardian Edith for the next two years, and when a hostile group attacks Wellington, Clementine is grazed by a bullet escaping from Wellington's destruction by the same hostile group, with her losing Edith. If traveling alone with AJ her finger is broken in a car door and she is forced to amputate it. No matter what the player chooses she will eventually end up tending for AJ alone. She encounters Ava, a woman who tells her about joining a group called the New Frontier.

Within the present of A New Frontier, Clementine had become a member of the New Frontier, but was exiled after stealing medicine from the group's doctor in an attempt to save a deathly ill AJ, a history she keeps quiet from others. She rescues Javier while trying to acquire a working vehicle and stays with him to help rescue his family at a nearby junkyard. They get into a conflict with other members of the New Frontier, and ultimately Clementine and Javier are forced to travel to Richmond, a fortified town that has been taken over by the New Frontier. Clementine helps Javier to assure his family's well-being and defuse the issues with the New Frontier and other survivor outposts. She learns that AJ is being kept at a ranch outside of town, and takes her leave to recover him.

The Walking Dead: The Final Season
The Final Season is the closure of Clementine's narrative arc in the series. Some years after the events of A New Frontier, Clementine and AJ, who is now a young boy, are traveling on their own. After stumbling into a walker horde, they are rescued by Marlon, the leader of a group of children from the abandoned Ericson boarding school. Clementine uses her time in the school to get to know the other children while helping them for sustainability and protection. Eventually, Clementine finds out that Marlon traded two of the school's residents, twin sisters Minerva and Sophie, to a group of raiders that threatened the school in exchange for safety and intends to do the same with her and AJ should they return. Clementine pressures Marlon to reveal the truth to the other kids, only for him to be shot and killed by AJ.
Some of the other kids vote for Clementine and AJ to leave the school, where in its outskirts they run into the raiders, one of them being Lilly, an old acquaintance of Clementine from their survivor group in the first season. Lilly threatens Clementine to return to the school and convince the rest of the children to join her group. Clementine and AJ escape with the help of James, a former member of the Whisperers, although AJ is shot and wounded. Clementine takes AJ back to Ericson for medical treatment and warns the kids of Lilly's incoming attack, helping them prepare by fortifying the school. Two weeks later, the raiders arrive. Despite the children's efforts to fight back, the raiders manage to kidnap some of them.

Clementine interrogates a captured raider and learns that his group has set up base on a riverboat west of the school. She scouts the place and decides that in order to sneak in and rescue the captured kids undetected, a horde of walkers need to be lured in to distract the raiders. Clementine enlists the help of James to do this, and obtains a homemade bomb to destroy the boat after they rescue the others. Clementine and her group infiltrate the boat when James draws the walkers towards it. Inside, they plant the bomb in the ship's boiler and encounter Minerva, now loyal to the raiders. She imprisons them with the other children and Clementine is confronted by Lilly, who reveals that Minerva killed Sophie when she tried to escape from their group. Lilly takes AJ away, and Clementine subdues Minerva and frees the kids. She fights and defeats Lilly, and is forced to tell AJ to shoot her or spare her life, the latter choice resulting in James being furious at AJ for killing Lilly or Lilly killing James. As this happens, the bomb goes off and the boat explodes.

Clementine and AJ escape the ship before it sinks. Clementine, AJ, and Tenn escape from the walker horde and find either Violet or Louis, who helps them make their way back to the school. They reach a bridge, but are attacked by a dying Minerva, who wounds Clementine's left leg. Clementine and AJ cross the bridge, and are forced to leave Tenn, Violet, or Louis to die to escape the walkers. Clementine is bitten by a walker on her wounded leg, and she and AJ take shelter inside a barn. Surrounded by walkers, Clementine tells AJ to make his way out through the roof, and to kill her to prevent re-animation or leave her behind to turn. In the game's ending, it is revealed that Clementine survived the bite after AJ amputated her infected leg. She is also shown to have assumed leadership of Ericson, finally having found a home.

Skybound X: Clementine Lives! 
Sometime after The Final Season, Clementine decides to leave Ericson's Boarding School. She goes into the fishing cabin and finds a map. After hearing rustling from a walker and taking it out, she begins to pack supplies until she hears creaking at the door. She goes to attack, only to discover it's AJ. He, assuming Clementine is only going on a trip, confronts her about leaving without him and demands to go with her, however she refuses to let him come with her and tells him she's not going on a trip. AJ lashes out at her for breaking her promise, Clementine tearfully tells him she feels safer with him at Ericson's with The Coalition around, but it's not home for her and she is unhappy and not even AJ can make her happy. Clementine tells AJ that she will go north and the two share a tearful departure as Clementine journeys north alone.

Clementine: Book One 
As Clementine continues northward, she is attacked by numerous walkers and while trying to escape, her prosthetic leg breaks. She then take a shelter in an abandoned barn. During her sleep, Clementine has a nightmare of Lee carrying her through the herd of walkers, but ends up dropping her, causing Clementine to wake up. Clementine continues her travels until she come across three Amish girls. She is spotted by the girls who notice her prosthetic and invite her to their town to get it replaced. Clementine arrives at their Amish community where she meets Rabby, a former dentist who makes a new prosthetic leg for Clementine. She leaves the settlement, climbs a tree and falls asleep while thinking of a name for her new leg. 

Clementine is woken up the next morning by an Amish boy named Amos heading off on his Rumspringa. She chases after him and alerts him that walkers are behind him. After killing the walkers with his axe, Amos asks Clementine where she is headed. She tells him she is travelling north and he informs her he is also travelling north. They travel together and Amos reveals that he is going to Killington in Vermont to build a homestead on the mountain where he will be awarded with a plane ride after the job is completed. They travel together in Amos' buggy into the night where they hear people calling for help, Amos helps the family into his buggy and Clementine drives them all to safety. While Clementine is asleep, one of the people they saved tries to assault Clementine. She holds a knife to his head and then stomps on his hand with her prosthetic foot before leaving. Amos chases after Clementine on his horse and asks her to come with him to Vermont. 

They travel together for nine days and finally arrive at the base of the mountain, where they are met with twin sisters who won't tell them their names. Clementine doesn't trust them and tells Amos she's staying with him. They ride a ski lift to the top where they meet a girl named Ricca. She informs Clem that she's been calling the twin with the ponytail Right, and the twin with her down Left. The twins tell them that they only have a cabin and shed left standing from last winter and that they want to build three new structures and a cleared road by the end of winter. They all settle down in the cabin for the night but are woken up by an avalanche hitting their cabin, putting a hole in their roof. 

That morning Clementine and Amos start fixing the roof while Ricca and Left go hunting. Later on, Clementine, Ricca and Amos all take a snowmobile out for a joyride and are reprimanded by Right after they come back for dinner. Time goes by as the five continue to build on the mountain, until Amos becomes ill with a fever. While Amos recovers, Left asks Clementine and Ricca to take a portable generator over to another ski lift so they can have more hunting territory. They take the snow mobile and find a broken bridge across a chasm. They decide to lower the generator into the chasm using rope, climb across and pull it back up. As they're lowering the generator it begins to gets pulled down causing Ricca to fall into the chasm. Clementine jumps down after her and finds the chasm filled with walkers. The two girls fight off the walkers, while fighting Clementine breaks her prosthetic leg. After clearing all the walkers the girls sit down and rest, Ricca picks up her glasses only to find them broken and Clementine tells her she named her now broken prosthetic Kenny. Ricca gives Clem her bat and decides to try and climb out of the chasm before they freeze to death.

Stumbling around the dark chasm with one leg, Clem finds more walkers and tries to fight them but is overpowered. She is rescued by a man named Tim, who tells her to stay quiet and that the walkers are all frozen so they move slowly. He carries Clem into a tunnel and tells her to follow behind him. While dealing with two walkers, Tim gets bitten on his cheek. He takes Clem to his tiny camp and asks if the twins are trying to build a homestead again. He reveals their real names to be Georgia and Olivia, telling Clem they're doing it all for their mother Epsey. After having a heart to heart Tim tells Clementine to get off the mountain and gives her his flashlight and hatchet. Clem finds her way out and finds Ricca. They climb out of the chasm and head back to camp where Amos has recovered from his fever and the twins ask Clementine where she found the hatchet, she tells them Tim gave it to her. Georgia asks where he is and goes out to find him, Olivia tries to go with her but is shoved to the floor by her sister and told to stay. Olivia starts to cry and Amos comforts her, resulting in the two sleeping together. Georgia returns covered in blood. 

Amos repairs Clem's prosthetic while Ricca and Olivia repair the broken generator. After fixing the generator, Olivia reveals to Clementine that her and Amos are leaving once they're done building the houses and that they plan to go to Amos' town where it's safe. She begs Clementine not to tell her sister, Clem promises she won't just as Georgia bursts in asking where Amos is, saying that the snowmobile and repaired generator are gone. Clem says he's trying to save their "screwed-up camp". Ricca sets off to find Amos, and Clementine who becomes worried about the pair decides to look for them as well. The pair find Clementine and tell her Amos fixed the ski lift but crashed the snowmobile, while they walk back to camp the see how real it now looks with the new structures they've built. The twins join them and Georgia decides they should all go hunting. While out, Georgia pushes Amos into a chasm, killing him. She then pulls a gun out and shoots at Clementine and Ricca while her sister tries to stop her. Clementine and Ricca run through the trees to hide and decide to rescue Olivia before getting off the mountain. Clem comes up with a plan and they wait until sundown to put it into action. Georgia heads back to the cabin and ties her sister up while she waits for Clem and Ricca. Clem cracks the ice and a walker comes out, while she and Ricca hide. Olivia thinks the walker is one of the girls and shoots it before getting struck in the shoulder with Clem's hatchet while Ricca unties Olivia but is shot in the process. 

An avalanche comes down the mountain and traps the girls in the cabin. Georgia is trapped beneath snow and begs at her sister to help her, telling her she had to kill Amos because he was going to take Olivia away from her, she is then bitten by a walker. Clementine breaks a hole in the roof so they can escape and kills the walker but leaves Georgia to turn. The three girls leave to find Amos' hat before descending the mountain. They get the bullet out of Ricca who recovers and Clementine finds a one eyed kitten whom Olivia names Dr. Barnwell. They walk for 2 weeks to Olivia's mothers house so they can steal her plane and fly away. While in the sky, Clementine asks Olivia to fly back north to Vermont to show Amos the plane one more time.

Clementine: Book Two 
In Clementine Book Two, Clementine and her new friends are rescued by an island community led by an enigmatic doctor called Miss Morro, but just as Clementine’s scars are finally beginning to heal, she discovers dark secrets that threaten to tear her new life apart.

Reception
The character has been acclaimed by both critics and fans. Many journalists consider Clementine to be an emotional centerpoint of The Walking Dead game, an accomplishment that few other video game characters have made. Game Informers Kimberley Wallace describes the character of Clementine as having "broken through the barrier [of the television screen], securing a place in the hearts of many". IGN's Colin Campbell said in his article that Clementine is designed to elicit "super-protective instincts" in the player. "Without Clementine, Lee is just some dude trying to stay alive, but she (a slightly over-cooked innocent) allows him to be sympathetic to us." commented Campbell. N.D. Mackay, writing in The Herald, described the relationship with Clementine as "the heart-breaking bedrock of the game." Kotaku's Kirk Hamilton writes that Clementine is a well-done, real-feeling character in the game. "...[she] is pretty great. She's cute and funny, smarter than she lets on, yet she still acts like a kid. She's one of the most realistically drawn kids I've encountered in a video game in some time." says Hamilton. GamesRadar's Hollander Cooper and Sterling McGarvey wrote that the hopelessness of the world would be infectious if not for her constant optimism, giving you something to fight for. "She’s slow to adapt to the fact that good and evil are now meaningless, and her innocence keeps the concept of hope alive in the survivors..." they stated. The Sunday Herald states that "Clementine is the real emotional heart of this game". Polygon included her and Lee as one of the 70 best video game characters of the 2010s with the publication's Colin Campbell writing, Lee is an escaped convict in the midst of a zombie outbreak who finds himself caring for a frightened, vulnerable girl called Clementine. Later seasons show Clementine’s debt to Lee, and the lessons she learned from her redoubtable mentor. These are characters who are genuinely loved by their many fans. Samuel James Riley of GamesRadar listed Clementine along with Lee as the best video game duos, and further stated that the character's story is touching and ultimately has tragic friendships in gaming history. Kevin Wong of Complex included her to his "best supporting character in video games", and stated that "It's hard to think of a video game character that's made more grown men cry than Clementine."

During the game's episodic release, players frequently used the Twitter hashtag "#forclementine" to reflect how much the character had influenced them. Vanaman was surprised but pleased with this response, stating that "the fact that people care about Clementine is invaluable".

Melissa Hutchison as Clementine was nominated for and won the award for "Best Performance By a Human Female" at the 2012 Spike TV Video Game Awards. Hutchison's performance has also been nominated in the "Performance" category for the 2013 British Academy Video Games Awards.

References

The Walking Dead video games
The Walking Dead (franchise) characters
Video game protagonists
Horror video game characters
Amputee characters in video games
Child characters in video games
Female characters in video games
Fictional American people in video games
Fictional characters from Georgia (U.S. state)
Orphan characters in video games
Teenage characters in video games
Woman soldier and warrior characters in video games
Video game characters introduced in 2012